Milena Andonova (born 23 September 1959) is a Bulgarian screenwriter and film director. She is best known for the film Monkeys in Winter, which she co-wrote and directed.

References

External links 

1959 births
Living people
Bulgarian film directors
Bulgarian screenwriters